Sidney Clarke (October 16, 1831 – June 18, 1909) was a U.S. Representative from Kansas, a Kansas state speaker of the house, and an Oklahoma territorial legislator. He was a part of the Oklahoma statehood movement.

Early life
Born in Southbridge, Massachusetts, Clarke attended the public schools. He was publisher of the Southbridge Press in 1854, and settled in Lawrence, Kansas, in 1859. Clarke enlisted as a volunteer during the Civil War, and was appointed assistant adjutant general of Volunteers by President Lincoln February 9, 1863. He served as captain and assistant provost marshal general for Kansas, Nebraska, Colorado, and Dakota.

Congressional career
Clarke was elected as a Republican to the Thirty-ninth, Fortieth, and Forty-first Congresses (March 4, 1865 – March 3, 1871). He served as chairman of the Committee on Indian Affairs (Forty-first Congress). He was an unsuccessful candidate in 1870 for reelection to the Forty-second Congress.

Later life
Clarke served in the Kansas state house of representatives in 1879 as an independent and was elected speaker. He moved to Oklahoma City, Oklahoma, in 1889 and engaged in railroad building. He served as chairman of the statehood executive committee in 1891, and as member of the Territorial council from 1898 to 1902. He also served on the Oklahoma City Council and as the second provisional mayor. He died in Oklahoma City, and was interred in Fairlawn Cemetery.

References

External links
 Encyclopedia of Oklahoma History and Culture - Clarke, Sidney

1831 births
1909 deaths
People from Southbridge, Massachusetts
Members of the Oklahoma Territorial Legislature
Members of the Kansas House of Representatives
Union Army officers
Oklahoma city council members
Mayors of Oklahoma City
Kansas Independents
Republican Party members of the United States House of Representatives from Kansas
19th-century American politicians
Military personnel from Massachusetts